Oh Yeah! is the eleventh studio album released in 1993 by KC and the Sunshine Band. This was the first album by the band since 1984, when the band split. Despite this, the album was unsuccessful, and failed to chart.

Track listing
"Megamix (The Official Bootleg)" (Casey, Finch, Carter) – 8:03
"Somebody Somewhere" (Casey, Weaver) – 3:07
"Will You Love Me in the Morning?" (Mollison) – 3:35
"Hold Me Tight" (Casey) – 3:10
"Give It Up" (Casey, Carter) – 3:30
"Please Don't Go (Live in Versilia)" (Casey, Finch) – 3:05
"Coast To Coast" (Casey, Shaffer) – 3:10
"I Can't Forget" (Casey) – 3:42
"Gonna Let It Go" (Casey) – 4:19
"Don't Stop" (McVie) – 3:25
"Turn the Music Up" (Casey, Weaver) – 3:18
"Desire" (Piccirillo) – 2:58
"High Above the Clouds" (Walden, Cohen) – 4:10

Personnel
Harry Wayne Casey – keyboards, vocal
Robyx – keyboards
Maurizio Bertozzi – keyboards
Marco Canepa – keyboards
Maria De Crescenzo – vocal
Beverly Champion Foster – background vocals

KC and the Sunshine Band albums
1993 albums